Patchur may refer to:
Patchur, Karaikal, a village in  Karaikal district, Puducherry, India
Patchur, a village near Natrampalli, Vellore district, Tamil Nadu, India